Soli Deo Gloria is the first studio album by Norwegian futurepop band Apoptygma Berzerk. It was originally released in 1993 and gained the band attention the world over. It had been out of print for years until it was remastered and reissued in 2003 by Tatra Records and then again in 2007 as a digital release. It was re-issued as a deluxe remaster edition with a digipak cover in 2008.

"Ashes To Ashes '93" is an updated version of the song "Ashes to Ashes" found on the band's first single of the same name.

All Tomorrow's Parties is a The Velvet Underground cover.

Track listing

Bonus tracks

2007 debut albums
Apoptygma Berzerk albums